SLAF Pidurutalagala  is the Sri Lanka Air Force radar station at the summit of Mount Pidurutalagala. It provides air surveillance and early warning and is home to the No 7 Air Defence Radar Squadron. A Chinese JY-11 Radar low/medium altitude 3D surveillance radar has been installed since 2008 as part of the National Air Defence System of Sri Lanka.

References

Sri Lanka Air Force bases
Buildings and structures in Nuwara Eliya District